Nikhil Patwardhan (born 2 June 1977) is an Indian former first-class cricketer. He is now an umpire and has stood in matches in the 2015–16 Ranji Trophy.

References

External links
 

1977 births
Living people
Indian cricketers
Indian cricket umpires
Madhya Pradesh cricketers
Cricketers from Indore